The following highways are numbered 266:

Canada
Manitoba Provincial Road 266
Prince Edward Island Route 266

Japan
 Japan National Route 266

United States
 Interstate 266 (unbuilt)
 U.S. Route 266
 Arizona State Route 266
 Arkansas Highway 266
 California State Route 266
 Colorado State Highway 266
 Georgia State Route 266
 Indiana State Road 266
 Iowa Highway 266 (former)
 K-266 (Kansas highway)
 Kentucky Route 266
 Minnesota State Highway 266 (former)
 Missouri Route 266
 Nevada State Route 266
 New Mexico State Road 266
 New York State Route 266
 Ohio State Route 266
 Oklahoma State Highway 266
 Pennsylvania Route 266 (former)
 South Carolina Highway 266
 Tennessee State Route 266
 Texas State Highway 266 (former)
 Texas State Highway Loop 266
 Farm to Market Road 266 (Texas)
 Utah State Route 266